The England Boxing National Amateur Championships Flyweight Championship formerly known as the ABA Championships is the primary English amateur boxing championship. It had previously been contested by all the nations of the United Kingdom.

History
The flyweight division was inaugurated in 1920 and is currently the weight category of under 52 Kg. The championships are highly regarded in the boxing world and seen as the most prestigious national amateur championships.

Past winners

References

England Boxing